Dadang Apridianto (born 24 April 1992) is an Indonesian professional footballer who plays as a central midfielder for Liga 1 club Persita Tangerang.

Club career

Persela Lamongan
He was signed for Persela Lamongan to play in Liga 1 in the 2020 season. This season was suspended on 27 March 2020 due to the COVID-19 pandemic. The season was abandoned and was declared void on 20 January 2021.

PSG Pati
In 2021, Dadang signed a contract with Indonesian Liga 2 club PSG Pati. He made first 2021–22 Liga 2 debut on 26 September 2021, coming on as a substitute in a 2–0 loss with Persis Solo at the Manahan Stadium, Surakarta.

Persita Tengerang
Dadang was signed for Persita Tangerang to play in Liga 1 in the 2022–23 season. He made his league debut on 14 August 2022 in a match against Persis Solo at the Indomilk Arena, Tangerang.

Honours

Club 
Kalteng Putra
 Liga 2 third place (play-offs): 2018

References

External links
 Dadang Apridianto at Soccerway
 Dadang Apridianto at Liga Indonesia

1992 births
Living people
Indonesian footballers
Liga 2 (Indonesia) players
Liga 1 (Indonesia) players
Persewangi Banyuwangi players
Persela Lamongan players
PSG Pati players
Persita Tangerang players
Association football midfielders
People from Banyuwangi Regency
Sportspeople from East Java